Title 10 of the Code of Federal Regulations is one of 50 titles composing the United States Code of Federal Regulations (CFR) and contains the principal set of rules and regulations issued by federal agencies regarding nuclear energy. It is available in digital and printed form and can be referenced online using the Electronic Code of Federal Regulations (e-CFR).

Structure 

The table of contents, as reflected in the e-CFR updated June 19, 2014, is as follows:

Parts 0 to 199 are the requirements (and reserved for the requirements) prescribed by the United States Nuclear Regulatory Commission (NRC) and binding on all persons and organizations who receive a license from NRC to use nuclear materials or operate nuclear facilities. Licensing is required for the design, manufacture, construction, operation and decommissioning of nuclear reactors. These facilities can be commercial, research or test reactors. The authority is broad covering the licensing of individual facilitatory operators to the entities which operate these facilities.

References 

 10
Nuclear power in the United States
Energy law
Energy policy of the United States